Yorgos Vrassivanopoulos (January 1, 1924 – February 10, 1998) was a Greek actor.

He was born in Athens on New Year's Day, 1924 and made his first appearance in the theatrical play Egmont by Goethe in 1951, in the theatrical company of Dimitris Rontiris. He also worked as a translator in dialogs from foreign movies  He was also a member of the boards of the Greek Actors' Guild, the Actors' Mutual Assistance Fund and a vice-president of the Retired Actors Union. He died after a prolonged sickness on February 10, 1998, and was buried at the First Cemetery of Athens.

Filmography

As an actor

As an actor

Sources
Biography and filmography  from the Multimedia CD-Rom Greek Filmography 1997 at Ethnodata.

External links

1924 births
1998 deaths
Greek male film actors
Male actors from Athens
20th-century Greek male actors